The Rhode Island Senate is the upper house of the Rhode Island General Assembly, the state legislature of the U.S. state of Rhode Island, the lower house being the Rhode Island House of Representatives. It is composed of 38 Senators, each of whom is elected to a two-year term. Rhode Island is one of the 14 states where its upper house serves at a two-year cycle, rather than the normal four-year term as in most states. There is no limit to the number of terms that a Senator may serve. The Rhode Island Senate meets at the Rhode Island State Capitol in Providence.

Like other upper houses of state and territorial legislatures and the federal U.S. Senate, the Senate can confirm or reject gubernatorial appointments to executive departments, commissions and boards and Justices to the Rhode Island Judiciary.

Senate leadership

The President of the Senate presides over the body, appointing members to all of the Senate's committees and joint committees, and may create other committees and subcommittees if desired. Unlike most other states, the Lieutenant Governor of Rhode Island does not preside over the Senate, and is instead active in other areas such as state commissions on health and businesses. In the Senate President's absence, the President Pro Tempore presides.

Democratic Leadership 
 Dominick J. Ruggerio (D) - President of the Senate
 Ryan W. Pearson (D) – Majority Leader
 Maryellen Goodwin (D) – Majority Whip
 Hanna Gallo (D) – President Pro Tempore

Republican Leadership 

 Jessica de la Cruz (R) – Minority Leader

Committee leadership

Make-up of the Senate 

2019-2021 Legislative Session

Members of the Rhode Island Senate

Past composition of the Senate

See also 
Rhode Island State Capitol
Rhode Island General Assembly
Rhode Island House of Representatives

References

External links 
Downloadable Rhode Island District Maps

Rhode Island General Assembly
State upper houses in the United States